The 1899 Dickinson football team was an American football team that represented Dickinson College as an independent during the 1899 college football season. The team compiled a 6–6–1 record and outscored opponents by a total of 184 to 108. Nathan Stauffer was the head coach. 

Andrew Kerr, later inducted into the College Football Hall of Fame, was a student at Dickinson at the time but did not play for the varsity football team.

Schedule

References

Dickinson
Dickinson Red Devils football seasons
Dickinson football